{{DISPLAYTITLE:C17H23NO3}}
The molecular formula C17H23NO3 may refer to:

 Acetoxyketobemidone
 Atropine
 Hyoscyamine
 Littorine
 MDPHP (3',4'-Methylenedioxy-α-pyrrolidinohexiophenone)
 Mesembrine

Chemical formulas